Pattenden is an English locational surname from a village in Kent which no longer exists.

Notable people with this name include
Colin Pattenden, English bass guitarist
Alf Pattenden, boxer
Thomas Pattenden, English cricketer
Rosemary Pattenden, Emeritus Professor University of East Anglia

References